Pirinçci is a Turkish surname. It is derived from the Turkish noun of Persian origin pirinç (cf.  (berenj)) with the meaning "rice" by adding the Turkish agentive suffix -ci and originally denoted a person either growing rice or trading in this agricultural commodity. Notable people with the surname include:

 Akif Pirinçci (born 1959), Turkish-born German writer
 Burcu Pirinçci (born 1990), Turkish female handballer

References

Turkish-language surnames
Occupational surnames